This is a list of properties and districts in Catoosa County, Georgia that are listed on the National Register of Historic Places (NRHP).

Current listings

|}

References

Catoosa
Buildings and structures in Catoosa County, Georgia